The Handbook of Traps and Tricks is a 1981 role-playing game supplement published by Dragon Tree Press.

Contents
The Handbook of Traps and Tricks is a compendium of traps mostly intended to be used with dungeons.

Reception
Aaron Allston reviewed The Handbook of Traps and Tricks in The Space Gamer No. 43. Allston commented that "A good supplement - but wait for the price to go down."

Reviews
 Casus Belli #84 (Dec 1994)

References

Fantasy role-playing game supplements
Role-playing game supplements introduced in 1981